

Administrative and municipal divisions

 ※ - under the oblast's jurisdiction

References

Kemerovo Oblast
Kemerovo Oblast